The Little Rock Grays were a Negro league baseball team in the Negro Southern League, based in Little Rock, Arkansas, in 1932. The 1932 Negro Southern League is considered a "major league" by Major League Baseball.

References

External links
 Franchise history at Seamheads.com
 Little Rock Grays at the Arkansas Baseball Encyclopedia

Negro league baseball teams
Baseball teams in Arkansas
Sports clubs disestablished in 1932
Baseball teams disestablished in 1932
Baseball teams established in 1932